The 12th constituency of the Rhône (French: Douzième circonscription du Rhône) is a French legislative constituency in the Rhône département. Like the other 576 French constituencies, it elects one MP using a two round electoral system.

Description

The 12th constituency of the Rhône lies to the west of Lyon hugging the river Rhône. The towns that make up this seat are interconnected suburbs of Lyon.  Since 2015 this constituency has been part of the Lyon Metropolis and therefore outside of the Rhône for administrative purposes.

Between 1988 and 2017 the seat was held by conservative Michel Terrot before the seat fell to the MoDems as part of the pro Emmanuel Macron centrist coalition.

Assembly Members

Election results

2022

 
 
|-
| colspan="8" bgcolor="#E9E9E9"|
|-
 
 

 
 
 
 
 
* Chambon ran as a PS dissident without the support of the party or the NUPES alliance.

2017

 
 
 
 
 
 
|-
| colspan="8" bgcolor="#E9E9E9"|
|-

2012

 
 
 
 
 
 
|-
| colspan="8" bgcolor="#E9E9E9"|
|-

2007

 
 
 
 
 
 
 
|-
| colspan="8" bgcolor="#E9E9E9"|
|-

2002

 
 
 
 
 
|-
| colspan="8" bgcolor="#E9E9E9"|
|-

1997

 
 
 
 
 
 
 
 
 
|-
| colspan="8" bgcolor="#E9E9E9"|
|-

References

12